A cantera is geographical area that football clubs recruit players from.

Cantera may also refer to:

Places
 Cantera (Ponce), a barrio of Ponce, Puerto Rico
 La Cantera Formation, a geologic formation in Argentina
 La Cantera, San Antonio, a district of San Antonio, Texas
 Las Canteras, a barrio of Montevideo, Uruguay

People
 Francisco Cantera Burgos (1901–1978), Spanish historian
 Zaida Cantera (born 1977), Spanish military officer and politician

Other uses
 Cantera (software), chemical kinetics software
 Cantera (stone), volcanic, quartz-based stone or quarry in Spanish
 Cantèra: (to be pronounced cantère in French) is an Occitan word from Bearn & Gascony, in the South-West of France, which in French means chanterie, mania or need to sing.